KPGE (1340 AM) is a radio station that, as of December 31, 2022, is silent, but was previously broadcasting a country music format. Licensed to Page, Arizona, United States, the station is currently owned by Lake Powell Communications, Inc.

The station's skywave signal was reported in Salt Lake City on 2007-11-27 and audio proof of the station was recorded.

The station was taken silent on December 31, 2022.

References

External links

PGE
Country radio stations in the United States